Scent of Love (국화꽃 향기 lit. Scent of Chrysanthemums) is a 2003 South Korean film, and the directorial debut of Lee Jeong-wook. The film is based on a novel of the same name by Kim Ha-in, and stars Jang Jin-young and Park Hae-il in the lead roles. Like her character, Jang Jin-young battled stomach cancer and died in 2009. The film received an around of 900,000 admissions nationwide and on May 16, 2003, the film was screened at the Cannes Film Festival.

Plot 
University student Seo In-ha meets a young woman on the subway and instantly falls in love. After joining a local book club, he is pleasantly surprised to find that the woman, Mun Hee-jae, is also a member. Although he makes a poor first impression, In-ha and Hee-jae eventually become friends, though he is left disappointed when she later rejects him, as she is more interested in another student, Kang Seong-ho.

Several years pass, with In-ha and Hee-jae going their separate ways. While Hee-jae and Seong-ho prepare to get married, In-ha, now a producer at a local radio station, still pines after his first love. When Hee-jae survives a car crash that kills her fiancé and parents, In-ha keeps a respectful distance. After a while he resumes his pursuit of her by reading out letters on his radio show, and finally winning her heart, the couple get married.

However, their happiness is short-lived, as Hee-jae becomes pregnant only to discover that she has stomach cancer, and must choose between her own life and the life of her unborn child.

Cast 
 Jang Jin-young ... Mun Hee-jae
 Park Hae-il ... Seo In-ha
 Song Seon-mi ... Choi Jeong-rae
 Kim Yu-seok ... Kang Seong-ho

References

External links 
 
 

2003 films
Films based on romance novels
Films based on South Korean novels
2000s Korean-language films
South Korean romantic drama films
2003 directorial debut films
2000s South Korean films